Gallagh Road railway station served Derry in  County Londonderry in Northern Ireland.

The Londonderry and Lough Swilly Railway opened the station on 1 March 1881.

It closed on 1 February 1924.

Routes

References

Disused railway stations in County Londonderry
Railway stations opened in 1881
Railway stations closed in 1924
1881 establishments in Ireland
1924 disestablishments in Northern Ireland
Railway stations in Northern Ireland opened in the 19th century